Tuburan, officially the Municipality of Tuburan, is a 2nd class municipality in the province of Cebu, Philippines. According to the 2020 census, it has a population of 68,167 people.

Tuburan was the hometown of the revolutionary leader Arcadio Maxilom. And is also known for its crystal-clear springs, beaches, creeks, rivers, caves and natural attractions.

Industrial and domestic products include decorative apparel and fashion accessories made of seashells and coconut shells, wood and other indigenous products. Tubod Festival is held every 13th of June in honor of the parish patron, Saint Anthony of Padua.

History

Foundation

Tuburan was founded in the 1851 by Don Mariano Montebon who came from the town of Sogod. The townsite was first located at Daan Lungsod which is just across the Adela River, north of the present poblacion. Tuburan got its name from the prevalence of springs, which are the sources of potable water for household use of the early settlers. "Tuburan" evolved from the Cebuano word Tubod, meaning "spring".

Philippine revolution

General Arcadio Maxilom y Molero was a hero of the Philippine Revolution. He was born in Tuburan where his family were members of the local gentry, or principalía. He worked as a public school teacher but later joined the Katipunan, whose activities in Cebu were led by León Kilat.

After Kilat's execution, Maxilom continued the revolution in Cebu as second in command. The Katipunan regrouped in the then impenetrable, mountainous central part of Cebu island which now part of the central highlands. On 16 December 1898, Maxilom wrote a letter to the Spanish authorities in Cebu, demanding the latter to surrender. The Spaniards quickly responded, weary after incessant fighting and on the impending defeat of the Spanish forces by the Americans overseas, on Christmas Eve of the same year, the Spaniards had left, leaving behind only three Catholic clerics.

Their newfound liberty short lived, when the Treaty of Paris took effect on December 10, 1898, Spain had to sell the fate of their former subjects to the United States for twenty million dollars.

Maxilom is best remembered for stubbornly refusing to surrender to the American occupying forces even as his fellow revolutionaries in Manila and Cebu were starting to capitulate or collaborate with the new colonial power. He finally surrendered on 27 October 1901. Virtually forgotten after the revolution, Maxilom died in his hometown of Tuburan, after a long period of time with paralysis. Decades later, the then, Mango Avenue of Cebu City, the second most historic road of the city was renamed after the late general.

Tuburan as Cebu's largest municipality
Tuburan is still the largest municipality in Cebu. But before the 1950s it was even bigger than the land area of Cebu City. The town's land area decreased in size when the former barangay Tabuelan separated from Tuburan to become the Municipality of Tabuelan in 1953.

Geography 
Tuburan is bordered to the north by the town of Tabuelan, to the west is the Tañon Strait, to the east are the towns of Carmen, Catmon and Sogod, and to the south is the town of Asturias.

Tuburan is the largest municipality in Cebu in terms of land area. It also has the most number of barangays for a municipality in Cebu. And it is also the only municipality in Cebu to have numerous barangays with very small population count. Most of these barangays are located in the mountains. The barangay with the lowest population count is Barangay Kanlunsing with 210 people as of 2016, though the barangay with the lowest recorded population count on Cebu Island is located in the nearby municipality of Catmon, which is the Barangay of Amancion, with 190 people in 2016.

Barangays

Tuburan comprises 54 barangays:

Climate

Demographics

Economy

This farm is located within the mountain barangay of Kabangkalan.

In addition, the coffee farm is gaining ground as a tourist attraction in an ecotourism niche.

Tourism
Scenic spots
Among the scenic spots are:
Springs of:

Marmol cliff and cave
Lantawan Lookout
White beaches of:

 Eco-tourism

Transportation
Ceres Liner and Corominas Bros. are among the bus companies going to the town. But riding a V-Hire is the quickest way of going to the town. There are three ways of getting to the town:
 V-Hire - Via Transcentral Highway (Balamban) - 80 km 
 Ceres Liner - Via Lugo (Tabuelan) - 100 km 
 Ceres Liner, Corominas Bros. - Via Toledo City - 110 km

References

Sources

External links

 [ Philippine Standard Geographic Code]

Municipalities of Cebu